Dulona (also Долона Dolona) is a village in Sughd Region, northern Tajikistan. It is part of the jamoat Mehrobod (formerly: Qamishqurghon) in Asht District.

References

Populated places in Sughd Region